Celithemis verna, the double-ringed pennant, is a species of skimmer in the family Libellulidae. It is found in North America.

The IUCN conservation status of Celithemis verna is "LC", least concern, with no immediate threat to the species' survival. The population is stable.

References

Further reading

 
 

Libellulidae
Insects described in 1935